Aurland Stadion is a multi-purpose stadium in Aurlandsvangen, Aurland, Vestland county, Norway. Built in 1960, it received all-weather running track in 1985 and was last renovated in 1992.

Sogndal Fotball played a home match at Aurland Stadion in 1998.

References

Football venues in Norway
Eliteserien venues
Athletics (track and field) venues in Norway
Sports venues in Vestland
1960 establishments in Norway
Sports venues completed in 1960
Aurland